Menodora scabra (formerly Menodora scoparia) is broom-like shrub in the Olive Family (Oleaceae), known by the common name rough menodora or broom twinberry. It is a popular desert garden plant.

Range and habit
It is native to the southwestern United States (Colorado, Arizona, Utah, New Mexico, Nevada, Texas and California) and northern Mexico (Coahuila, Durango, Nuevo León, Chihuahua, Sonora), where it grows in varied mountain, plateau, and desert habitat.

Growth pattern
Menodora scabra is a small, multibranched subshrub producing several upright stems no more than 30 centimeters tall. It is coated in rough hairs and short, woolly fibers.

Leaves and stem
The leaves are oblong or oval, smooth along the edges, and opposite on the lower parts of the stems, becoming alternate above. They are 1-3 cm long and 1-6 mm wide, the larger leaves located lower on the plant.

Flowers and fruit
The inflorescence is a loose cluster of yellow flowers at the tip of a stem branch. The flower corolla has 4 to 6 lobes with the stamens and stigma protruding from the short throat. The fruit is a capsule.

Ethnobotanical uses
Native American Navajo people developed cold infusion of this plant to treat heartburn and facilitate labor for childbirth. A root decoction was used to treat spinal pain.

References

External links
Calphotos Photo gallery
Lady Bird Johnson Wildflower Center
Firefly Forest, Southeastern Arizona Wildflowers and Plants of the Sonoran Desert
Vascular Plants of the Gila Wilderness, Western New Mexico University
Southwest Biodiversity Information Network

scabra
Plants described in 1852
Flora of the Chihuahuan Desert
Flora of Mexico
Flora of the Southwestern United States